The robust climbing salamander (Bolitoglossa robusta) is a species of salamander in the family Plethodontidae.
It is found in Costa Rica and Panama.
Its natural habitats are subtropical or tropical moist lowland forests and subtropical or tropical moist montane forests.
It is threatened by habitat loss.

References

Bolitoglossa
Taxonomy articles created by Polbot
Amphibians described in 1894